Apostolos Telikostoglou (born 9 March 1995) is a Greek taekwondo athlete. He won a silver medal at the 2019 World Taekwondo Championships on the men's welterweights.

He won one of the bronze medals in the men's 80 kg event at the 2022 Mediterranean Games held in Oran, Algeria.

References

External links 

 

Greek male taekwondo practitioners
Living people
1995 births
Competitors at the 2018 Mediterranean Games
Competitors at the 2022 Mediterranean Games
Mediterranean Games bronze medalists for Greece
Mediterranean Games medalists in taekwondo
World Taekwondo Championships medalists
Sportspeople from Kozani
21st-century Greek people